Albany is a town in eastern Livingston Parish, Louisiana, United States. The population was 1088 at the 2010 census. It is part of the Baton Rouge metropolitan statistical area.

District 95 State Representative Sherman Q. Mack, an attorney, resides in Albany.

Etymology
It is speculated that the name of the community is derived from the Choctaw word abani which means "to cook over a fire" in the Choctaw language. After interviewing many of the older residents and comparing their answers it was determined that the community was named after the nearby Natalbany River. During an interview Mrs. George (Mary Addison) Cunningham who was born on November 11, 1884, stated that when the Illinois Central Railroad built a line through the town they tried to name the community Natalbany but the railroad and post office refused the name because there was already a community with the same name.

Hungarian Settlement
Historic Hungarian Settlement is in Albany. Between 1896 and 1920 hundreds of Hungarian immigrants settled here and named the community Árpádhon. In 1900, there were eleven families living in the Hungarian Settlement and by 1908 there were about forty Hungarian families on new farms in the area. By 1910, there were sixty-five families. In 1920, there were about two hundred families on farms in the area. The Hungarian name is derived from Árpád, the leader of the Hungarian tribes and -hon meaning home. Árpádhon was the largest rural Hungarian settlement in the United States at that time with an estimated 350 Hungarian families living within the community. During the 1930s many of the Hungarian families became strawberry farmers.

Geography
Albany is located at the intersection of U.S. Route 190 and Louisiana Highway 43 and I-12 passes south of the city. The Little Natalbany River flows past the east side of the city and joins the Natalbany River approximately two miles to the southeast.

Demographics

As of the census of 2000, there were 865 people, 371 households, and 234 families residing in the town. The racial makeup of the village was 97.69% White, 0.12% African American, 0.35% Native American, 0.12% Asian, 0.81% from other races, and 0.92% from two or more races. Hispanic or Latino of any race were 1.50% of the population.

There were 371 households, out of which 32.1% had children under the age of 18 living with them, 47.4% were married couples living together, 11.1% had a female householder with no husband present, and 36.7% were non-families. 32.1% of all households were made up of individuals, and 16.7% had someone living alone who was 65 years of age or older. The average household size was 2.33 and the average family size was 2.92.

In the town, the population was spread out, with 25.7% under the age of 18, 9.7% from 18 to 24, 29.7% from 25 to 44, 20.3% from 45 to 64, and 14.6% who were 65 years of age or older. The median age was 34 years. For every 100 females, there were 92.7 males. For every 100 females age 18 and over, there were 89.1 males.

The median income for a household in the town was $25,208, and the median income for a family was $39,167. Males had a median income of $35,000 versus $21,111 for females. The per capita income for the village was $16,407. About 14.3% of families and 20.3% of the population were below the poverty line, including 16.8% of those under age 18 and 27.7% of those age 65 or over.

Cultural and historic sites
 The Hungarian Settlement School is located in Albany and was listed on the National Register of Historic Places on August 2, 2001. The old school is home to the Hungarian Settlement Museum and the grand opening was celebrated on September 27, 2017.
 In 1909, a twenty-acre church site was donated by Mr. and Mrs. Joseph Juhasz and in that same year, Archbishop James Blenk from the Archdiocese of New Orleans approved the official name of St. Margaret Catholic Church
 Albany Plantation, which promotes the heritage of the French Cajun culture of Louisiana, sits on 34 acres of land.

Education
Albany is within the Livingston Parish Public Schools system.

Schools that serve Albany include:

Albany Lower Elementary School (Louisiana)
Albany Upper Elementary School (Louisiana)
Albany Middle School (Louisiana)
Albany High School

References

External links
 Hungarian Settlement Museum
 St. Margaret Queen of Scotland Church
 Árpádhon Hungarian Settlement Cultural Association

Hungarian-American history
Villages in Livingston Parish, Louisiana
Villages in Louisiana
Villages in Baton Rouge metropolitan area